James Traill DD (died 1783)  was an Anglican bishop in the second half of the 18th century.

A Scot, he held incumbencies at Horsleydown and West Ham. He was Chaplain to Francis Seymour-Conway, 1st Marquess of Hertford, Lord Lieutenant of Ireland who elevated him to the Bishopric of Down and Connor in 1765.

He died on 12 November 1783.

Notes

Bishops of Down and Connor
Bishops of Raphoe
18th-century Anglican bishops in Ireland
18th-century Scottish Episcopalian bishops